Ōzutsu Takeshi (born 18 April 1956 as Takakoshi Matsumoto) is a former sumo wrestler from Mie, Japan. Beginning his professional career in May 1971, he was ranked in the top makuuchi division continuously from March 1979 to January 1992, and his record of 1170 consecutive bouts there is the second best in history after Takamiyama. His highest rank was sekiwake. He was runner-up in one tournament and earned ten kinboshi or gold stars for defeating yokozuna. He also won four sanshō or special prizes. He wrestled for Taihō stable and after his retirement in May 1992 he worked there as a coach before leaving the Japan Sumo Association in 2008.

Career
Born in Yokkaichi, he came from a sumo family as his father, Ryuichi Matsumoto, was a professional sumo wrestler known as Kenryu Taketora who reached a highest rank of jūryō 1 in 1955. Ōzutsu joined Nishonoseki stable in May 1971 at the age of 15. The great yokozuna Taihō retired in the same tournament and that December he followed Taihō to a newly created heya, Taihō stable. In his early days he wrestled under a different shikona, Daishin. In July 1977 he became a sekitori for the first time upon promotion to the jūryō division. He was injured during the November 1977 tournament and had to withdraw, dropping back to makushita. However, he was never to miss another bout in his career. Upon his return to jūryō in March 1978 he adopted the shikona of Ōzutsu (literally "big cannon"; he was sometimes nicknamed "Top Gun"). In September 1978 he claimed the jūryō championship with an 11–4 record (his only career yusho), and in January 1979, after losing a playoff for the championship to Ōshio he was promoted to the top makuuchi division for the March 1979 tournament.

Ōzutsu won the Fighting Spirit Prize in his second top division tournament in May 1979, and in July he defeated two yokozuna, Wakanohana and Mienoumi, the first of his ten career kinboshi. In March 1980 he made his san'yaku debut at komusubi but fell short with a 6–9 record. He was runner-up to Kitanoumi with an 11–4 record in March 1981 and was promoted to sekiwake, the highest rank he was to achieve. He held it on two further occasions, in July 1981 and November 1983, and made his final appearance in san'yaku at komusubi in November 1984, continuing as a rank-and-file maegashira for the rest of his makuuchi career.

He won his first two bouts against Chiyonofuji before the latter became a yokozuna, and earned two kinboshi from him in September 1984 and March 1986, but was defeated by him on every one of the 37 other occasions they met. He was the man Chiyonofuji beat in September 1989 to reach 965 career wins, more than any other wrestler in history.

He remained in the top division for 78 consecutive tournaments but was finally demoted in January 1992 after recording only a 4–11 score at maegashira 15. His 1170th and final bout in makuuchi was a win over Mainoumi. He announced his retirement from sumo two tournaments later at the age of 36 after facing certain demotion to the makushita division.

Retirement from sumo
Ōzutsu remained in sumo as an elder of the Japan Sumo Association, and worked as a coach at Taihō stable, initially under the name Ōtake Oyakata. In 1997 he switched to the Tateyama kabu when it was vacated by the former ōzeki Daiju. In 2003 Taihō retired as head coach and the former Takatōriki took over, renaming the heya Ōtake stable. Ōzutsu continued to work as a coach there until 2008 when his Tateyama stock, which he was only borrowing, was needed by the retiring Tamakasuga. Ōzutsu had to leave the Sumo Association as a result. He now runs a French-style restaurant in Yokohama.

Fighting style
Ōzutsu was a yotsu-sumo wrestler, preferring to fight on the mawashi rather than push his opponents. His favourite grip was migi-yotsu, with a right hand inside and left hand outside his opponent's arms. His most common winning kimarite was yori-kiri or force out, but he also regularly used his outside grip to win by uwatenage (overarm throw) and uwatedashinage (pulling overarm throw). He was also fond of tsuridashi, the lift out.

Career record

See also
List of sumo record holders
List of sumo tournament top division runners-up
List of sumo tournament second division champions
List of past sumo wrestlers
List of sekiwake

References

External links
Complete career record

1956 births
Living people
Japanese sumo wrestlers
Sumo people from Mie Prefecture
Sekiwake
People from Yokkaichi